Splendrillia albicans is a species of sea snail, a marine gastropod mollusk in the family Drilliidae.

Description 
The shell is slightly longitudinally ribbed with the ribs nodose at the sutures, with revolving striae towards the base of the body whorl . The shell is whitish, more or less tinged with chestnut. The length of the shell is 6 mm.

Distribution 
This species occurs in the demersal zone of the Straits of Malacca at a depth of 30 m.

References 

  Tucker, J.K. 2004 Catalog of recent and fossil turrids (Mollusca: Gastropoda). Zootaxa 682:1–1295.

External links 
 

albicans
Gastropods described in 1843